The New England Scholastic Band Association or NESBA as it is more commonly known, is a sanctioning body for marching band, winter percussion, and winter guard contests in the New England region.

Marching band
Each fall, NESBA holds several marching band competitions, in which anywhere from 10 to 40 bands from across New England compete.  The bands are scored individually on a scale of 0–100.  The scores are broken down into 5 subcategories:

 General Effect Music - a grade of the overall impression of the musical selections
 Ensemble Music - a grade of the quality and arrangement of the musical selections
 Performance Music - a grade of the execution of the musical selections
 General Effect Visual - a grade of the overall impression of the drill and visual aspects of the show
 Performance Visual - a grade of the execution of the drill and visual aspects of the show

Each subcategory is given a grade from 0 to 20, and the 5 scores are added to get the total score.  Medals are awarded on the following scale:

 Bronze: 45.00 - 74.99
 Silver: 75.00 - 84.99
 Gold: 85.00 - 94.99
 Platinum: 95.00 and above

In addition, caption awards are given to one group in each division for the following categories:

 High Auxiliary - selected by visual judges for the best colorguard and other visual effects
 High Music - selected by the music performance and ensemble judges, and given to the band with the highest aggregate scores in Performance and Ensemble Music
 High Percussion - selected by all music judges for the best percussion and pit ensemble.

References

External links
NESBA Homepage

High school marching bands from the United States
Music organizations based in the United States